Agnes Beahn Baggett (April 9, 1905 – December 15, 1992) was an American politician who served in the state of Alabama. She served as Alabama's Secretary of State from 1951 to 1955, 1963–1967 and 1975–1979. She also served as Alabama State Treasurer from 1959–1963 and 1967–1975. She was also the inaugural holder of the position of State Auditor.

Early life 
Baggett was born and raised in Columbus, Georgia where she was educated in public schools.

Career 
Baggett served as law clerk in the office of the district attorney of the L. & N. Railroad at Montgomery from March 1925 to October 1927, and in the Alabama Secretary of State's office from October 1927 to March 1946. She also served as assistant clerk of the Supreme Court of Alabama from August 15, 1946, until the spring of 1950.

In 1951, Baggett served as the Alabama Secretary of State until 1955. In 1955 Baggett served as the Alabama state auditor until 1959. In 1959, Baggett served as the Alabama State Treasurer again until 1963. In 1963, Baggett served as the Alabama Secretary of State again until 1967. In 1967, Baggett served as the Alabama State Treasurer again until 1975. In 1975, Baggett served as the Alabama Secretary of State again until 1979. Baggett was one of the most elected officials in Alabama history.

References

http://www.archives.alabama.gov/conoff/baggett.html

1905 births
1992 deaths
Alabama Democrats
Women state constitutional officers of Alabama
State Auditors of Alabama
State treasurers of Alabama
Secretaries of State of Alabama
People from Columbus, Georgia
20th-century American women